Ceryx bernhardi is a moth of the subfamily Arctiinae. It was described by Seitz.

References

Ceryx (moth)